Bjørk is a Faroese and Norwegian given name meaning "birch". Bjørk also appears as a family name.

The Icelandic & Swedish spelling of the name is Björk. Notable people with the name include:

 Liv Bjørk, Norwegian handball goalkeeper
 Bjørk Herup Olsen (born 1991), Faroese middle and long distance runner

Norwegian masculine given names
Scandinavian masculine given names
Norwegian-language surnames